The surname O'Loughlin is an Anglicised form of the Irish Ó Lochlainn meaning "descendant of Lochlann".

People with the surname

 Alex O'Loughlin (born 1976), Australia-born actor 
 Charlie O'Loughlin, English football defender 
 Chris O'Loughlin (fencer) (born 1967), American Olympic fencer
 David O'Loughlin, Irish cyclist
 Gerald S. O'Loughlin (1921–2015), American actor
 Harold J. O'Loughlin (1900-1968), American lawyer, businessman, and politician
 Jack O'Loughlin (Australian footballer) (1873–1960)
 Laurence O'Loughlin (1854–1927), South Australian politician
 Marina O'Loughlin, British journalist, writer and restaurant critic
 Michael O'Loughlin (born 1977), Australian rules footballer
 Sean O'Loughlin (born 1982), English professional rugby league footballer
 Silk O'Loughlin (1872–1918), American baseball umpire
 Thomas O'Loughlin, Professor of Historical Theology
 Vanessa O'Loughlin, British-born writer and literary agent

References

Anglicised Irish-language surnames
Surnames of Irish origin